Zaven I  was a catholicos of the Armenian Apostolic Church. He reigned from 377 to 381 AD and second of three catholicoi from the Albaniosid Dynasty.

Catholicoi of Armenia
4th-century archbishops
4th-century Armenian bishops